Nepotilla nitidula is a species of sea snail, a marine gastropod mollusk in the family Raphitomidae.

Description
The length of the shell attains 2.5 mm, its diameter 1.3 mm.

Distribution
This marine species is endemic to New Zealand and occurs off Northland east coast to Poor Knights Islands

References

 Powell, A.W.B. 1979 New Zealand Mollusca: Marine, Land and Freshwater Shells, Collins, Auckland
 Spencer, H.G., Marshall, B.A. & Willan, R.C. (2009). Checklist of New Zealand living Mollusca. Pp 196-219. in: Gordon, D.P. (ed.) New Zealand inventory of biodiversity. Volume one. Kingdom Animalia: Radiata, Lophotrochozoa, Deuterostomia. Canterbury University Press, Christchurch.

External links
 Spencer H.G., Willan R.C., Marshall B.A. & Murray T.J. (2011). Checklist of the Recent Mollusca Recorded from the New Zealand Exclusive Economic Zone
 

nitidula
Gastropods described in 1940
Gastropods of New Zealand